Idle Hour or variation, may refer to:

Arts and entertainment
 Hours of Idleness (book) 1807 poetry collection by Lord Byron
 Idle Hours (album), a 1962 blues album
 Idle Hours (painting), an 1894 landscape painting

Places, buildings, structures
 Idle Hour, Lexington, Kentucky, USA; a neighborhood
 Idle Hour, Oakdale, Suffolk County, Long Island, New York State, USA; the former Vanderbilt estate
 Idle Hours, Beaumont, Texas, USA; an NRHP-listed country house
 Idle Hour Stock Farm, Lexington, Kentucky, USA; a former thoroughbred horse farm

See also

 
 
 Hour (disambiguation)
 Idle (disambiguation)